Sadatoshi (written: 貞敬, 貞利, 定俊 or 贞敏) is a masculine Japanese given name. Notable people with the name include:

 (died 1944), Imperial Japanese Navy admiral
 (born 1939), Japanese volleyball player
  (1900–1970), Imperial Japanese Navy admiral

Japanese masculine given names